Darmian (also Romanized as Darmīān and Darmiyān; also known as Dād Dān) is a village in Darmian Rural District of the Central District of Darmian County, South Khorasan province, Iran. At the 2006 National Census, its population was 1,269 in 340 households. The following census in 2011 counted 1,645 people in 442 households. The latest census in 2016 showed a population of 1,657 people in 478 households; it was the largest village in its rural district.

References 

Darmian County

Populated places in South Khorasan Province

Populated places in Darmian County